In algebraic geometry, a contraction morphism is a surjective projective morphism  between normal projective varieties (or projective schemes) such that  or, equivalently, the geometric fibers are all connected (Zariski's connectedness theorem). It is also commonly called an algebraic fiber space, as it is an analog of a fiber space in algebraic topology.

By the Stein factorization, any surjective projective morphism is a contraction morphism followed by a finite morphism.

Examples include ruled surfaces and Mori fiber spaces.

Birational perspective 
The following perspective is crucial in birational geometry (in particular in Mori's minimal model program).

The basic question is which face F gives rise to such a contraction morphism (cf. cone theorem).

See also 
Castelnuovo's contraction theorem
Flip (mathematics)

References 

Robert Lazarsfeld, Positivity in Algebraic Geometry I: Classical Setting (2004)

Algebraic geometry